Dunswell is a village in the East Riding of Yorkshire, England, and in the civil parish of Woodmansey.

Historically also known as Beer-Houses due to the presence of two Inns in close proximity, the village is located on the main Kingston upon Hull to Beverley road. A significant drinking water extraction works was opened in 1931 west of the village, helping to supplying Hull and the surrounding area.

Geography

The village has a hall, Dunswell Village Institute; and a primary school Dunswell Primary, since 2014 Dunswell Academy.

The Ship Inn is located at the junction of the main road and Ings Lane leading to Skidby Landing on the River Hull.

Hull Livestock Market, the last remaining livestock market in East Riding of Yorkshire, has been located in the village since 2002.

Governance
The village was in the Beverley and Holderness parliamentary constituency until the 2010 general election when it was transferred to the constituency of Haltemprice and Howden.

History

According to Charles Overton, Dunswell was once known as Douceville, a reference to its many springs and wells. At one time it was also known as Beer-Houses due to the two public houses in close vicinity. The two pubs in the village, The Coach and Horses (aka The Plough) and The Wagon and Horses, are thought to originate from the 17th century. The Hull to Beverley road was turn-piked in 1741.

An act allowing the construction of the Beverley and Skidby Drain was passed in 1785, and the Beverley and Barmston Drain allowed by an act of 1798. In 1880 improvements to the lower reaches of the drainage system enabled further extraction, and a steam engine for drainage was installed at Dunswell for the Skidby Drain. The drainage of the land reduced flooding, but caused some local wells to become dry.

In around 1814 a non-conformist chapel ("Bethel") was built in the village for the Methodist New Connexion branch. In the 1850s the village consisted of two Inns on the Hull and Beverley road, with the village west along Dunswell Lane, with fewer than twenty houses. The village school opened in 1881.

In 1893 the Newington Water Company gained authorisation to open a water supply works at Dunswell to replace a source at Swanland that had become contaminated by salt. The company was taken over by the Hull Corporation shortly after. In 1911 permission was given for additional water works at Dunswell, and after being halted by the First World War, they were restarted in 1923 on a larger scale – the water pumping station was opened in 1931. The works was one of the three main water supplies for the area, along with Springhead Pumping Station and Mill Dam in Cottingham. The adit system was expanded in the early 1950s to meet demand from the borough of Beverley but the works did not yield an increase in supply.

St Faiths Church of England church opened in 1951; the non-conformist chapel held its last service in 1968.

Low level housing development took place in the second half of the 20th century, with houses on Ings Lane, and houses and new cul-de-sac streets south of the Dunwell Lane/Beverley Road junction (The Meadows, Dene Close). In 1985 the village became part of the civil parish of Woodmansey.

In 2013 Dunswell primary school was listed for closure by East Riding of Yorkshire Council; the closure, which was opposed by many nearby residents was averted by transferring to academy status, as a subsidiary of the primary school in Swanland.

Gallery

Notes

References

Sources

External links

, entrance detail

Villages in the East Riding of Yorkshire
Holderness